Menai Bridge Tigers Football Club is a Welsh football team based in Menai Bridge on the Isle of Anglesey in north-west Wales.  The team currently play in the North Wales Coast West Football League Premier Division, which is at the fourth tier of the Welsh football league system.

History
The history of football clubs playing in Menai Bridge sees teams playing in the various leagues operating in North Wales, as well as clubs being formed and folding with considerable gaps of clubs playing in leagues.

Football in the town of Menai Bridge can be traced back as early as 1878, when The North Wales Express reported on a Christmas Day football match between the Menai Football Club and Blue Star, with the latter winning by 3 goals (plus one disputed) to one.

First league appearances
In 1897, the Menai Bridge Football Club unanimously resolved to join the proposed Anglesey League and finished the 1897–98 season as league champions, before joining the North Wales Coast League for the 1898–99 season, where they finished bottom of the league.  Records show Menai Bridge Tigers featuring in Division Two of the same league from 1909–10 until the outbreak of World War One.

1920s and 1930s
The 1926–27 and 1927–28 seasons saw the club as compete in the Welsh National League (North) as a Division Two West club.

The team then again feature in the Anglesey League as Menai Bridge finishing 1928–29 as champions and the 1929–30 season as runners-up before joining the North Wales Coast League for the 1930–31 season and moving to the Bangor & District League for the 1931–32 season, as one of two Anglesey based teams to feature in the league. The club won two league titles in the 1932–33 and 1933–34 seasons.

Post Second World War to mid 1960s
As Menai Bridge, the team finished runners-up in Division IIIA (Anglesey League Division Two) in 1947–48, runners-up of the Welsh League North Division Two (Western) in 1948–49, and champions of Division IIIB (Anglesey League Division Two) in 1950–51. and continued to play in the Anglesey League until the end of the 1963–64 season. Menai Bridge Youth played in Caernarfon & District League during the following 1964–65 season but the team seems to disappear after that.

1970s and 1980s
The team returned to the Anglesey League as Menai Bridge Tigers for the 1975–76 season, finishing in fourth place, and then were league runners-up on three successive occasions, in 1976–77; 1977–78 and 1978–79.  The club then finished third in the 1979–80 season and were promoted to the Welsh League North for the 1980–81 season. They finished bottom of the table and after finishing third from bottom of the league the following season were relegated.

The club then returned to the Anglesey League, finishing third in Division Two.  As part of ongoing discussions around restructuring of football in North Wales, the club hosted a meeting at the Menai Bridge Tigers Sports and Recreation Club on 23 June 1983, and the Gwynedd Football League was born. Admitted into the league were Benllech & District, Bethesda Athletic, Conwy United, Llandudno Amateurs, Llanfairpwll, Menai Bridge Tigers, Porthmadog and Y Felinheli.   The club finished bottom of the table scoring only three points (one win and one draw) from fourteen matches.  Following the end of the season the club resigned from the league because of financial difficulties. The 1984–85 season saw football return to the town with a club called Menai Bridge Town appearing in the Anglesey League Division Two until the end of the 1988–89 season.  The next two decades were spent as a junior only club.

2000s return to senior football
The club returned to the Anglesey League for the 2009–10 season as Menai Bridge Tigers finishing seventh from nine clubs.  The 2013–14 season was successful with the club finishing the season as league champions and gaining promotion to the Gwynedd League.  The 2018–19 season saw further success with the club finishing as Gwynedd League champions.  Promotion to the Welsh Alliance League Division Two was denied by the Football Association of Wales, even after the club appealed the initial decision from the FAW.

The club finished third in 2019–20, the final season of the Gwynedd League and joined the newly formed North Wales Coast West Football League Premier Division for the 2020–21 season. This was cancelled due to the COVID-19 pandemic, with the club starting the 2021–22 season when amateur football returned to Wales in the summer of 2021.

Honours

Leagues
Gwynedd League
Champions (1): 2018-19
Anglesey League
Champions (3): 1897–98, 1928–29, 2013–14
Runners-up (3): 1922–23, 1929–30, 1947-48 1976–77, 1977–78, 1978–79
Division Two – Champions (1): 1950-51
Division Two – Runners-up (1): 1947-48
Bangor & District League
Winners (2): 1932–33, 1933–34
Runners-up (1): 1931–32

Cups
North Wales Coast FA Junior Challenge Cup – Winners (8 - competition record): 1911–12, 1913–14, 1926–27, 1929–30, 1931–32, 1932–33, 1946–47, 1947–48

Anglesey League
Dargie Cup – Winners (2): 1928–29, 1978–79
Elias Cup – Winners (1): 2012–13
IPP Cup – Winners (1): 2013–14
JW Lees Shield – Winners (1): 1981–82
Megan Cup – Winners (4): 1930–31, 1978–79, 2012–13, 2013–14
SK Williams Challenge Shield - Winners (1): 1979–80

Gwynedd League
Gwynedd Cup – Winners (2): 2014–15, 2018–19
Bob Owen Memorial Shield – Winners (1): 2015–16

References

External links
Club official Website

Football clubs in Wales
North Wales Coast Football League clubs
Gwynedd League clubs
Sport in Anglesey
Anglesey League clubs
Welsh National League (North) clubs
Bangor & District League clubs
Welsh League North clubs
North Wales Coast League clubs
Menai Bridge